Events from the year 1621 in Sweden

Incumbents
 Monarch – Gustaf II Adolf

Events

 The Swedish city of Gothenburg is founded by King Gustavus Adolphus of Sweden.  The king also grants city rights to Luleå, Piteå and Torneå (Tornio).  Riga falls under the rule of Sweden.
 The 1621 War Articles, the first completed organization of the Swedish law collection of military and war, is issued.
 The first national wide regulation of the Guilds is issued: all handicrafts outside the guilds are banned. 
 
 , a Finnish language psalm book, by Olof Elimaeus.

Births

 2 June - Rutger von Ascheberg, officer and civil servant  (died 1693) 
 February 2 - Johannes Schefferus, humanist  (died 1679) 
 
 

 unknown - Brita Klemetintytär, postmaster  (died 1700)

Deaths

 13 December - Catherine Stenbock, queen consort  (born 1535)

References

 
Years of the 17th century in Sweden
Sweden